Paranurus is a genus of beetles in the family Carabidae, containing the following species:

 Paranurus dilaticeps (Chaudoir, 1865)
 Paranurus macleayi (Sloane, 1895)
 Paranurus petri Tschitscherine, 1901

References

Pterostichinae